Flavian Laplante (1907-1981) was a Holy Cross Brother and a missionary who worked in Bangladesh from 1932 until 1981. He was a teacher and then a headmaster in different Catholic schools in the districts of Barisal, Noakhali and Chittagong. Later he was involved with the socio-economic development of the Jolodash community. He founded Miriam Ashram at Diang, on the 1 Karnaphuly River. He also built a grotto with the statue of Our Lady of Lourdes and turned it into a shrine.

Early life 
Flavian Laplante was born on 27 July 1907 in St.-Louis-de-Richelieu, Quebec, Canada to Honoré Laplante and Louise Théroux. He was the seventh child of nine.

Brotherhood 
Flavian joined Congregation of Holy Cross at the age of 16. He took the name, Brother Flavian, on 15 August 1923. He professed Final Vows on 16 August 1928. He served at the Notre Dame College in Quebec as a teacher and dorm supervisor.

Mission to Bangladesh 
Flavian was assigned to the Congregation's mission in East Bengal in 1932.

André Bessette remarked when he was leaving for his mission, "How fortunate you are in becoming a missionary. I envy you." He arrived Chittagong in East Bengal on 1 December 1932. His first assignment was at a high school in Padrishibpur. Besides construction of the school he also taught at the school and later on was appointed as a Principal. He reached Chittagong in May 1942 to help people, when Japan was conducting air raids. He stayed there even at the time of famine. He started a project for fisherman to get new boats after World War II. He also started an orphanage at Diang. he was sent to Noakhali from 1957 to 1962. In Diang he renamed the settlement there Miriam Ashram or the “Marian Hermitage." He also started Women's Promotion Center with the help of the Holy Cross sisters. “Kalidaha Fishing Project”  was started in 1975 to help fisherman motorize their boats and founded a technical school to give them the skills to build and repair their own boats. On 24 December 1976 he retired to the life of a hermit. He installed  a statue of Our Lady on 1 October 1978 and organized the feast day on 11 February 1979.

Death 
Laplante died in Bangladesh on 19 June 1981 after prolonged illness.

Beatification 
Flavian Laplante was declared a Servant of God by Patrick D’Rozario on 13 February 2009.

References 

20th-century Canadian Roman Catholic priests
Canadian Servants of God
Canadian Roman Catholic missionaries
Canadian hermits
Congregation of Holy Cross
1981 deaths
1907 births
Roman Catholic missionaries in Bangladesh